Jordantown, is an African Canadian community, originally named Brindley Town, in Nova Scotia, Canada, located in The Municipality of the District of Digby in Digby County.

Members of the community can trace their ancestral roots back over 200 years, when black people first came to Nova Scotia as Black Loyalists who joined British colonial forces during the American Revolutionary War.

References
Jordantown on Destination Nova Scotia

Communities in Digby County, Nova Scotia
General Service Areas in Nova Scotia